Maximilian Adelbert Baer Jr. (born December 4, 1937) is an American actor, producer, comedian, and director widely known for his role as Jethro Bodine, the dim-witted relative of Jed Clampett (played by Buddy Ebsen) on The Beverly Hillbillies.

Early life
Baer was born Maximilian Adalbert Baer Jr. in Oakland, California, on December 4,  1937, the son of boxing champion Max Baer and his wife Mary Ellen Sullivan. His paternal grandfather was of German Jewish descent, and his mother was of Irish descent. His brother and sister are James Manny Baer and Maude Baer. His uncle was boxer and actor Buddy Baer. 

He attended Christian Brothers High School in Sacramento, where he earned letters in four sports and twice won the junior title at the Sacramento Open golf tournament. (Playing with Charlie Sifford, he later won the pro–am tournament at the 1968 Andy Williams - San Diego Open.)

Baer earned a bachelor's degree in business administration from Santa Clara University, with a minor in philosophy.

Career
Baer's first acting role was in Goldilocks and the Three Bears at the Blackpool Pavilion in England in 1949. He began acting professionally in 1960 at Warner Bros., where he made appearances on television programs such as Maverick, Surfside 6, Hawaiian Eye, Cheyenne, The Roaring 20's, and 77 Sunset Strip. His career took off two years later, when he joined the cast of The Beverly Hillbillies.

The Beverly Hillbillies

In 1962, Baer was cast in the role of the naïve but well-meaning Jethro Bodine, Jed Clampett's cousin Pearl's son.

He continued to take other parts during the nine-year run of The Beverly Hillbillies and appeared on the television programs Vacation Playhouse and Love, American Style, as well as in the Western A Time for Killing.

He declined to appear in the 1981 TV movie Return of the Beverly Hillbillies and his character was recast as a result.

Later career

Following the cancellation of The Beverly Hillbillies in 1971, Baer made numerous guest appearances on television, but he found his TV acting career hampered by typecasting. He concentrated on feature motion pictures, especially behind the camera, writing, producing, and directing. Baer wrote and produced the drama Macon County Line (1974), in which he played Deputy Reed Morgan, the highest-grossing movie per dollar invested at the time. Made for US$110,000, it earned almost US$25 million at the box office, a record that lasted until The Blair Witch Project surpassed it in 1999. Baer also wrote, produced, and directed the drama The Wild McCullochs (1975), and played the role of Culver Robinson.

Baer is credited with being one of the first to use the title of a popular song as the title and plot anchor of a film, acquiring the rights to Bobbie Gentry's hit song and producing the 1976 film Ode to Billy Joe, which he also directed. Made for US$1.1 million, the film grossed $27 million at the box office, and earned over US$2.65 million outside the US, US$4.75 million from television, and US$2.5 million from video. The film starred Robby Benson and Glynnis O'Connor.

Since the success of Ode to Billy Joe, the motion picture industry has produced more than 100 song-title movies. Baer pursued the rights to the hit song "Like a Virgin", recorded by the singer Madonna in 1984. When ABC tried to prevent him from making the film, he sued and won a judgment of more than US$2 million.

He directed the 1979 comedy Hometown U.S.A. before retiring to his home at Lake Tahoe, Nevada. He continues to make occasional guest appearances on television.

Other ventures
In 1985, Baer began investigating the gambling industry. He noted that tourists paid a US$5 to $6 admission to tour the "Ponderosa Ranch", in Incline Village, Nevada, which was the location for filming exterior scenes for episodes of TV's popular program Bonanza. The Ponderosa  was a cattle ranch with horses, barns, Bonanza displays, restaurants, hay rides, and a wedding chapel, and tourists enjoyed the Ponderosa because of the Bonanza connection. Baer decided that tourists would also pay for something dealing with The Beverly Hillbillies. He began using his Jethro Bodine role as a marketing opportunity toward the gambling and hotel industry. Baer obtained the sublicensing rights, including food and beverage rights, to The Beverly Hillbillies from CBS in 1991. His business partner estimates the cost of obtaining the rights and developing the ideas at US$1 million. Sixty-five Beverly Hillbillies slot machines were built in 1999 and placed in 10 casinos.

In late 2003, Baer attempted the redevelopment of a former Walmart location in Carson City into a Beverly Hillbillies-themed hotel and casino, but was unsuccessful due to building code conflicts and other developers on the neighboring properties. On May 4, 2007, he announced the sale of the property and the purchase of another parcel just outside Carson City, in neighboring Douglas County, where he expected less resistance to his plans. Baer purchased a  parcel in north Douglas County for US$1.2 million, and would purchase an additional  once he obtained the required zoning variances. The plans were for a  gambling area with 800 slot machines and 16 tables, flanked by various eateries, including "Jethro's All You Ken Et Buffet". The project would feature a showroom, cinema complex and a 240-room, five-story hotel.

Plans for Baer's casino included a  mock oil derrick spouting a 20- to  flame.

As of July 2012, development of Jethro's Casino had been suspended. Ongoing litigation involving Baer, the developer and Douglas County has delayed the development of the project indefinitely.

In 2014, Baer sued CBS after claiming a secret deal with a Des Moines-based Jethro's BBQ was interfering with his opportunity to cash in on his role from the iconic television show. The lawsuit claims that Baer negotiated a deal with CBS for the rights to use the fictional character and other motifs from the show to create a chain of restaurants, hotels, and casinos.

Recent years
He remained close friends with Buddy Ebsen until Ebsen's death from pneumonia on July 6, 2003. Just before his acting mentor's death, Donna Douglas and he both had visited Ebsen in the hospital.

In January 2008, Baer’s live-in girlfriend, 30-year-old Penthouse model Chere Rhodes, committed suicide in the 70-year-old's Lake Tahoe home. Her suicide note mentioned "relationship problems".

The 2015 death of co-star Donna Douglas left Baer as the only surviving regular cast member of The Beverly Hillbillies.

Filmography

List of credits

References

External links
 
 
 
 Official site of Jethro's Beverly Hillbillies Mansion & Casino
 Watch Max Baer in Jethro's First Love

1937 births

American male child actors
American male film actors
American male screenwriters
American male television actors
American people of Czech-Jewish descent
American people of German-Jewish descent
American people of Scotch-Irish descent
Film directors from California
Film producers from California
Living people
Male actors from Oakland, California
Male actors from Sacramento, California
Santa Clara University alumni
Screenwriters from California
Western (genre) television actors
Writers from Oakland, California
Writers from Sacramento, California